Powelliphanta superba is a species of large, carnivorous land snail in the family Rhytididae, which is endemic to the South Island of New Zealand. Five subspecies are recognised, all of which are classified by the New Zealand Department of Conservation as being Nationally Endangered.

Powelliphanta superba harveyi
Powelliphanta superba mouatae
Powelliphanta superba prouseorum
Powelliphanta superba richardsoni
Powelliphanta superba superba

The eggs are oval and seldom constant in dimensions .

See also
List of non-marine molluscs of New Zealand

References

Powelliphanta
Gastropods described in 1930
Gastropods of New Zealand
Taxa named by Arthur William Baden Powell
Endemic fauna of New Zealand
Endemic molluscs of New Zealand